The Slovak Basketball Cup is the top-tier level national domestic basketball cup competition, that is played between professional clubs in Slovakia. The first edition of the cup tournament was held in 1996.

Cup winners

1996 Inter Bratislava
1997 Davay Pezinok
1998 Chemosvit
1999 Davay Pezinok
2000 Davay Pezinok
2001 Chemosvit
2002 Davay Pezinok
2003 Inter Bratislava
2004 Chemosvit
2005 Chemosvit
2006 04 AC LB Spišská Nová Ves
2007 Lučenec
2008 Basket Pezinok
2009 Basket Pezinok
2010 Basket Pezinok
2011 not held
2012 Nitra
2013 Komárno
2014 Iskra Svit
2015 Inter Bratislava
2016 Inter Bratislava
2017 Košice
2018 Košice
2019 Levickí Patrioti
2021 Spišskí Rytieri

Titles by club

See also
 Slovak Basketball League

External links
Slovak Cup at Flashscore.com
Slovak Basketball League Official Website 
Slovak Basketball League at Eurobasket.com

Basketball competitions in Slovakia
Basketball cup competitions in Europe
Basketball in Slovakia
Recurring sporting events established in 1996
1996 establishments in Slovakia